The 1967 Valley State Matadors football team represented San Fernando Valley State College—now known as California State University, Northridge—as a member of the California Collegiate Athletic Association (CCAA) during the 1967  NCAA College Division football season. Led by sixth-year head coach Sam Winningham, Valley State compiled an overall record of 6–4 with a mark of 3–2 in conference play, tying for second place in the CCAA. This was the first winning season for the Matadors in their sixth year of existence. Valley State played home games at Birmingham High School in Van Nuys, California.

Schedule

Team players in the NFL
No Valley State players were selected in the 1968 NFL Draft.

The following finished their college career in 1967, were not drafted, but played in the NFL.

References

Valley State
Cal State Northridge Matadors football seasons
Valley State Matadors football